The 1957 Ole Miss Rebels football team represented the University of Mississippi during the 1957 NCAA University Division football season. The Rebels were led by 11th-year head coach Johnny Vaught and played their home games at Hemingway Stadium in Oxford, Mississippi (and alternate site home games in Jackson, Mississippi). They competed as members of the Southeastern Conference, finishing in second with a regular season record of 8–1–1 (5–0–1 SEC), and were ranked 7th in the final AP Poll. They were invited to the 1958 Sugar Bowl, where they defeated Texas, 39–7.

Schedule

Roster
DB Billy Brewer
E Johnny Lee Brewer

References

Ole Miss
Ole Miss Rebels football seasons
Sugar Bowl champion seasons
Ole Miss Rebels football